"Don't Know What You Got (Till It's Gone)" is a power ballad written by Tom Keifer and performed by the glam metal band Cinderella, from their second album Long Cold Winter. Released in August 1988, it was their most successful single, peaking at number 12 on US Billboard Hot 100 in November 1988.

The music video for this song was filmed at Mono Lake.

Critical reception
Melody Maker and New Musical Express, British musical periodicals, reviewed this single in ironical style. The Stud Brothers of first supposed that the band penned a Coca-Cola anthem, Simon Williams of NME called musicians a "pumpkins" and made an assumption that husky voice of the singer was due to laryngitis which he got due very long touring and recommended the to take a break.

Chart performance

References

1980s ballads
1988 singles
1988 songs
Cinderella (band) songs
Glam metal ballads
Mercury Records singles
Songs about heartache
Songs written by Tom Keifer